Takurō Mochizuki (望月 拓郎, born 28 August 1972) is a Japanese mathematician at Kyoto University.

Overview 
As a student at the University of Kyoto in 1994, Mochizuki left his undergraduate studies early to become a graduate student in mathematics at the same university. He completed his Ph.D. in 1999, and joined the faculty of Osaka City University, returning to Kyoto in 2004.

He was awarded the Japan Academy Prize in 2011 for his research on D-modules in algebraic analysis. In 2014 he was a plenary speaker at the International Congress of Mathematicians.

Mochizuki was awarded the 2022 Breakthrough Prize in Mathematics for his work on "the theory of bundles with flat connections over algebraic varieties".

References

Further reading
. Also in Astérisque No. 352 (2013), Exp. No. 1050, viii, 205–241, .

External links
Home page

1972 births
Living people
People from Nagano (city)
20th-century Japanese mathematicians
21st-century Japanese mathematicians
Kyoto University alumni
Academic staff of Kyoto University